Electriclarryland is the seventh studio album by the American rock band Butthole Surfers, released on May 6, 1996 by Capitol Records. This album brought Butthole Surfers their first Top 40 hit with "Pepper". The album was certified gold by the RIAA on August 20, 1996.
The title of this album is a parody of Jimi Hendrix's third studio album entitled Electric Ladyland. This is the second time the band has used a parody title for one of their releases. The first was Hairway to Steven, which references the song "Stairway to Heaven" by Led Zeppelin. The album's original title was going to be Oklahoma!, but fearing lawsuits, Capitol forced the band to change the name.

Although the album has no Parental Advisory label, it was also released in a "clean" version with profanities removed, an alternate album cover, and the band being credited as "B***H*** Surfers".

The song "The Lord Is a Monkey" was featured in two 1996 films, an alternate "Rock Version" in the Beavis and Butt-head Do America soundtrack and the original in Black Sheep. Additionally, the band performed "Ulcer Breakout" on an episode of The Larry Sanders Show.

The basic recordings were made at Paul Leary's house in Austin, Texas, at Arlyn Studios, also in Austin, and Bearsville Studios in Woodstock, New York. Mixing and mastering was done at Ocean Way Recording in Los Angeles, California.

Album cover
The album cover depicts a man's eardrum being impaled by a pencil. The original album artwork was inspired by the 1974 Hi-Fi murders. It was then replaced by a cover depicting a prairie dog due to the graphic image.

Critical reception

Track listing
All songs written by the Butthole Surfers.

Personnel

Butthole Surfers
 Gibby Haynes  – vocals, keyboards
 Paul Leary – producer, guitar, mixing, bass
 King Coffey  – drums

Additional personnel
 Andrew Weiss – bass (tracks 4, 6, 7, 9, 10)
 Bill Carter – bass (tracks 2 and 12)
 John Hagen – cello (track 2)
 Fooch – pedal steel guitar (track 7)
 Mark Eddinger – keyboards (track 3)
 Danno Saratak – drum programming (tracks 3 and 10)
 Steve Thompson – producer
 Christopher Shaw – engineer, mixing
 Stuart Sullivan – engineer, mixing
 Paul Mavrides – illustrations, cover design, cover art
 Will Van Overbeek – photography
 Tommy Steele – art direction
 Wendy Dougan – art direction, design

Charts

Weekly charts

Year-end charts

Singles

Certifications

References

Butthole Surfers albums
1996 albums
Capitol Records albums
Albums produced by Paul Leary